Terrytown is the name of several places in the United States:

Terrytown, Louisiana
Terrytown, Nebraska

It is also the name of a YouTube series.